The 2019 season was Bodø/Glimt's second season back in the Eliteserien since their relegation at the end of the 2016 season. Bodø/Glimt finished the season in second position, qualifying for the first qualifying round of the UEFA Europa League. In the Norwegian Cup, they were knocked out by Strømmen in the second round.

Squad

Transfers

Winter

In:

Out:

Summer

In:

Out:

Competitions

Eliteserien

Results summary

Results by round

Results

Table

Norwegian Cup

Squad statistics

Appearances and goals

|-
|colspan="14"|Players away from Bodø/Glimt on loan:
|-
|colspan="14"|Players who left Bodø/Glimt during the season:

|}

Goal scorers

Clean sheets

Disciplinary record

References

Bodo Glimt
FK Bodø/Glimt seasons